Carpet bombing, also known as saturation bombing, is a large area bombardment done in a progressive manner to inflict damage in every part of a selected area of land. The phrase evokes the image of explosions completely covering an area, in the same way that a carpet covers a floor. Carpet bombing is usually achieved by dropping many unguided bombs.

Carpet bombing of cities, towns, villages, or hamlets containing a concentration of civilians is considered a war crime as of Article 51 of the 1977 Protocol I of the Geneva Conventions.

The term obliteration bombing is sometimes used to describe especially intensified bombing with the intention of destroying a city or a large part of the city. The term area bombing refers to indiscriminate bombing of an area and also encompasses cases of carpet bombing, including obliteration bombing. It was used in that sense especially during World War II and the Korean War.

Early history 
One of the first attempts at carpet bombing was at the Battle of El Mazuco during the Spanish Civil War in 1937, against widely-dispersed infantry on rocky slopes, and the attacking Condor Legion learned that carpet bombing was not very effective in such terrain.

In March 1938, the Bombing of Barcelona saw Italian and German airstrikes killing up to 1,300 people and wounding 2,000. It is considered the first carpet bombing of a city, and set precedent for several such bombings in World War II.

During World War II 
In the European Theatre, the first city to suffer heavily from aerial bombardment was Warsaw, on 25 September 1939. Continuing this trend in warfare, the Rotterdam Blitz was an aerial bombardment of Rotterdam by 90 bombers of the German Air Force on 14 May 1940, during the German invasion of the Netherlands. The objective was to support the German assault on the city, break Dutch resistance, and force the Dutch to surrender. Despite a ceasefire, the bombing destroyed almost the entire historic city centre, killing nearly nine hundred civilians and leaving 30,000 people homeless. The destructive success of the bombing led the Oberkommando der Luftwaffe (OKL) to threaten to destroy the city of Utrecht if the Dutch Government did not surrender. The Dutch capitulated early the next morning.

As the war progressed, the Battle of Britain developed from a fight for air supremacy into the strategic and aerial bombing of London, Coventry and other British cities. In retaliation for this, the British built up the RAF Bomber Command, which was capable of delivering many thousands of tons of bombs onto a single target, in spite of heavy initial bomber casualties in 1940. The bomber force was then wielded by Arthur Travers Harris in an effort to break German morale and obtain the surrender which Douhet had predicted 15 years earlier. The United States joined the war and the USAAF greatly reinforced the campaign, bringing the Eighth Air Force into the European Theatre. Many cities, both large and small, were virtually destroyed by Allied bombing. Cologne, Berlin, Hamburg and Dresden are among the most infamous, the latter two developing firestorms. W. G. Sebald's book, On the Natural History of Destruction, comments on the carpet bombing of German cities and asks why it does not play a larger part in the German national consciousness, and why virtually no German authors have written about the events. Despite the lack of literary coverage, a style of film, the rubble film, shot among the urban debris and depicting the gritty lives of those who had to rebuild the destroyed cities, developed in the years after the end of World War II.

Carpet bombing was also used as close air support (as "flying artillery") for ground operations. The massive bombing was concentrated in a narrow and shallow area of the front (a few kilometers by a few hundred meters deep), closely coordinated with the advance of friendly troops. The first successful use of the technique was on 6 May 1943, at the end of the Tunisia Campaign. Carried out under Sir Arthur Tedder, it was hailed by the press as Tedder's bomb-carpet (or Tedder's carpet). The bombing was concentrated in a four by three-mile area, preparing the way for the First Army. This tactic was later used in many cases in the Normandy Campaign; for example, in the Battle for Caen.

In the Pacific War, carpet bombing was used extensively against Japanese cities such as Tokyo. On the night of 9–10 March 1945, 334 B-29 Superfortress heavy bombers were directed to attack the most heavily populated civilian sectors of Tokyo. In just one night, over 100,000 people burned to death from a heavy bombardment of incendiary bombs, comparable to the wartime number of U.S. casualties in the entire Pacific theater. Another 100,000 to one million Japanese were left homeless. These attacks were followed by similar ones against Kobe, Osaka, and Nagoya, as well as other sectors of Tokyo, where over 9,373 tons of incendiary bombs were dropped on civilian and military targets. By the time of the dropping of the atomic bombs on Hiroshima and Nagasaki, light and medium bombers were being directed to bomb targets of convenience, as most urban areas had already been destroyed. In the 9-month long bombing campaign, over 300,000 Japanese civilians died and 400,000 were wounded.

Vietnam War
During the Vietnam War, with the escalating situation in Southeast Asia, twenty-eight B-52Fs were fitted with external racks for twenty-four 750-pound (340 kg) bombs under project South Bay in June 1964; an additional forty-six aircraft received similar modifications under project Sun Bath. In March 1965, the United States commenced Operation Rolling Thunder. The first combat mission, Operation Arc Light, was flown by B-52Fs on 18 June 1965, when 30 bombers of the 9th and 441st Bombardment Squadrons struck a communist stronghold near the Bến Cát District in South Vietnam. The first wave of bombers arrived too early at a designated rendezvous point, and while maneuvering to maintain station, two B-52s collided, which resulted in the loss of both bombers and eight crewmen. The remaining bombers, minus one more that turned back for mechanical problems, continued toward the target. The force returned to Andersen AFB except for one bomber with electrical problems that recovered to Clark AFB, the mission having lasted 13 hours. Post-strike assessment by teams of South Vietnamese troops with American advisors found evidence that the VC had departed the area before the raid, and it was suspected that infiltration of the south's forces may have tipped off the north because of the ARVN troops involved in the post-strike inspection.

Beginning in late 1965, a number of B-52Ds underwent Big Belly modifications to increase bomb capacity for carpet bombings. While the external payload remained at twenty-four 500-pound (227 kg) or 750-pound (340 kg) bombs, the internal capacity increased from twenty-seven to eighty-four 500-pound bombs or from twenty-seven to forty-two 750-pound bombs. The modification created enough capacity for a total of 60,000 pounds (27,215 kg) in one hundred and eight bombs. Thus modified, B-52Ds could carry 22,000 pounds (9,980 kg) more than B-52Fs. Designed to replace B-52Fs, modified B-52Ds entered combat in April 1966 flying from Andersen Air Force Base, Guam. Each bombing mission lasted 10 to 12 hours with an aerial refueling by KC-135 Stratotankers. In spring 1967, the aircraft began flying from U Tapao Airfield in Thailand giving the aircraft the advantage of not requiring in-flight refueling.

The zenith of B-52 attacks in Vietnam was Operation Linebacker II (sometimes referred to as the Christmas Bombing) which consisted of waves of B-52s (mostly D models, but some Gs without jamming equipment and with a smaller bomb load). Over 12 days, B-52s flew 729 sorties and dropped 15,237 tons of bombs on Hanoi, Haiphong, and other targets. Originally 42 B-52s were committed to the war; however, numbers were frequently twice this figure.

See also

Aerial bombardment and international law
Aerial bombing of cities
Area bombardment
Bombing of Warsaw in World War II
Churchill's advocacy of chemical strike against German cities
Civilian casualties of strategic bombing
Giulio Douhet, an early theorist of bombing
Roerich Pact
Strategic bombing
Tactical bombing
Terror bombing

References

Notes

Bibliography

External links
"Bombs Over Cambodia" from The Walrus

Aerial bombing